Gamanam is a 1994 Indian Malayalam film, directed by Sree prakash, starring Thilakan and Lakshmi in the lead roles.

Plot

Constable Cheriyan who was accused in the murder of his wife's sister is acquitted by court. However his wife Bhanumathi and son Surendran were not ready to accept this verdict and believe that Cheriyan was the real murderer. 
Cheriyan who is a constable in the police station where Surendran takes charge as SI. Surendran resolves to take revenge on his father while Cheriyan resigns due to the poor treatment from Surendran. Rose the Daughter of Cheriyan still loves her father, despite objections from mother and brother.

Keshavan Nair, a family friend of Cheriyan is empathetic towards Cheriyan and tries to mend the relationships. Advocate Bhasi, friend of Surendran also tries for reconciliation. Meantime, Surendran marries Adv Shyama, daughter of Kesavan Nair while Vinayan comes forward to marry Rose despite knowing her family background. Vinayan is empathetic towards Cheriyan and in their meeting, Cheriyan narrates the mishap that happened to Bhanumathi's sister that led to Cheriyan's conviction. 
Actually Cheriyan helped Bhanumathi in the past and their relationship ended up in marriage. Bhanumathi's differently abled sister was also staying with them. One day when Bhanumathi was out for consulting her gynecologist, her sister was raped and killed by someone and circumstances led to Cheriyan being suspected.
Back to present, Bhanumathi applies for a divorce to keep Cheriyan away and on the date of court hearing, the actual killer confesses to Adv.Bhasi, thus making the family to realise their mistake and repent for what they did to Cheriyan. But it was too late and they had to pay a huge price for punishing an innocent Cheriyan.

Cast
 Thilakan as Const.Cheriyachan	
 Lakshmi as Bhanumathy	
 Baiju as Vinayan
 Vijayakumar as S.I Suredran
 Delhi Ganesh as Keshavan Nair	
 K. B. Ganesh Kumar as Adv.Bhasi	
 Maathu as Adv. Shyama
M. S. Thripunithura as H.C Anthapathmanabha Iyyer
Kuthiravattam Pappu as Const. Kunjuraman 
Sarada Preetha as Rose
Durga (Malayalam actress) as Bhanumathi's differently abled sister

Soundtrack 
The music was composed by Ouseppachan and the lyrics were penned by Bichu Thirumala.

References

External links

1994 films
1990s Malayalam-language films
Films scored by Ouseppachan